Artipus is a genus of broad-nosed weevils in the beetle family Curculionidae. There are about 10 described species in Artipus.

Species
These 10 species belong to the genus Artipus:
 Artipus calceatus Marshall, 1926 c g
 Artipus coryaceus Sahlberg, 1823 c g
 Artipus corycaeus Sahlberg, 1823 g
 Artipus floridanus Horn, 1876 i c g b (little leaf notcher)
 Artipus freyanus Kuschel, 1958 c g
 Artipus grisescens Chevrolat, 1880 c g
 Artipus monae Wolcott, 1941 c g
 Artipus porosicollis Chevrolat, 1880 c g
 Artipus psittacinus Gyllenhal, 1834 c g
 Artipus unguiculatus Chevrolat, 1880 c g
Data sources: i = ITIS, c = Catalogue of Life, g = GBIF, b = Bugguide.net

References

Further reading

External links

 

Entiminae